Live at the Dynamo is the second major live release by British folk metal band Skyclad. It contains some of the same tracks as Another Fine Mess but was distributed in a different market.

Track listing
 "Intro" – 1:57
 "Another Fine Mess" – 4:37
 "Cardboard City" – 4:40
 "Art Nazi" – 3:50
 "The Wickedest Man in the World" – 3:57
 "The One Piece Puzzle" – 6:01
 "Still Spinning Shrapnel" – 4:28
 "Just What Nobody Wanted" – 5:29
 "The Widdershins Jig" – 3:35
 "The Declaration of Indifference" – 4:01
 "The Cradle Will Fall" – 6:46
 "#Spinning Jenny" – 3:08

2002 compilation albums
2002 live albums
Skyclad (band) albums